The following are the scheduled events of association football for the year 2014 throughout the world.

Events

Men's national teams

AFC
 25 December 2013 – 7 January: 2014 WAFF Championship in 
  
  
  
 4th 
 19 – 30 May: 2014 AFC Challenge Cup in 
  
  
  
 4th 

CAF
 11 January – 1 February: 2014 African Nations Championship in 
  
  
  
 4th

CONCACAF
 3 – 13 September: 2014 Copa Centroamericana in the 
  
  
  
 4th 
 10 – 18 November: 2014 Caribbean Cup in 
  
  
  
 4th

UEFA
 29 – 31 May: 2014 Baltic Cup in 
  
  
  
 4th

FIFA
  
  
  
 4th

Men's youth

UEFA
 9 – 21 May: UEFA Under 17 Championship in 
   
  
 19 – 31 July: UEFA Under 19 Championship in

AFC
 11–26 January: 2013 AFC U-22 Championship in 
  
  
  
 4th 
 6 – 20 September: 2014 AFC U-16 Championship in 
  
  
 9 – 23 October: 2014 AFC U-19 Championship in

Women's national teams

AFC
 15 – 19 April: 2014 WAFF Women's Championship in 
  
  
  
 4th

Women's youth

FIFA
  
  
  
 4th 
  
  
  
 4th

Multi-sports events

Men's
 14 – 27 August: 2014 Summer Youth Olympics in Nanjing, .
  
  
  
 4th 
 14 September – 2 October: 2014 Asian Games in Incheon, .
  
  
  
 4th 
 19 – 28 November: 2014 Central American and Caribbean Games in Veracruz, .
  
  
  
 4th

Women's
 14 – 27 August: 2014 Summer Youth Olympics in Nanjing, .
  
  
  
 4th 
 14 September – 1 October: 2014 Asian Games in Incheon, .
  
  
  
 4th 
 17 – 27 November: 2014 Central American and Caribbean Games in Veracruz, .
  
  
  
 4th

Fixed dates for national team matches
Scheduled international matches per the FIFA International Match Calendar:
17–25 March
1–9 September
6–14 October
10–18 November

Club continental champions

Men

Women

Domestic leagues

CONCACAF nations

Men

Women

CONMEBOL nations

AFC nations

Men

Women

UEFA nations

Men

Women

CAF nations

OFC nations

Domestic cups

UEFA nations

Men

Women

AFC nations

CONCACAF nations

CONMEBOL nations

Men

Women

CAF nations

Deaths

January
 1 January: Josep Seguer, Spanish international footballer and manager (born 1923)
 5 January: Eusébio, Portuguese international footballer (born 1942)
 January 5– Mustapha Zitouni, Algerian-French defender, capped for the France national football team, the FLN football team and the Algeria national football team. (85)
 13 January: Bobby Collins, Scottish international footballer (born 1931)
 15 January: Gennadi Matveyev, Soviet international footballer (born 1937)
 19 January: Bert Williams, English international goalkeeper (born 1920)
 25 January: Milan Ružić, Yugoslavian international footballer (born 1955)

February
 1 February: Luis Aragonés, Spanish international football player and manager (born 1938)
 1 February: Stefan Bozhkov, Bulgarian international footballer (born 1923)
 8 February: Philippe Mahut, French international footballer (born 1956)
 10 February: Gordon Harris, English international footballer (born 1940)
 12 February: Josef Röhrig, German international footballer (born 1925)
 13 February: Jimmy Jones, Northern Irish international footballer (born 1928)
 13 February: Richard Møller Nielsen, Danish international footballer and manager (born 1937)
 14 February: Tom Finney, English international footballer (born 1922)
 19 February: Antonio Benítez, Spanish international footballer (born 1951)
 19 February: Kresten Bjerre, Danish international footballer and coach (born 1946)
 25 February: Mário Coluna, Portuguese international footballer and manager (born 1935)
 26 February: Dezső Novák, Hungarian international footballer (born 1939)
 28 February: Kevon Carter, Trinidadian international footballer (born 1983)

March
 4 March: László Fekete, Hungarian international footballer (born 1954)
 6 March: Luis Rentería, Panamanian international footballer (born 1988)
 12 March: René Llense, French international footballer (born 1913)
 13 March: Petar Miloševski, Macedonian international footballer (born 1973)
 15 March: Jürgen Kurbjuhn, German international footballer (born 1940)
 20 March: Hilderaldo Bellini, Brazilian international footballer (born 1930)
 27 March: Augustin Deleanu, Romanian international footballer (born 1944)
 30 March: Fred Stansfield, Welsh international footballer (born 1917)

April
 8 April: Herbert Schoen, East German international footballer (born 1929)
 15 April: Claudio Tello, Chilean international footballer (born 1963)
 16 April: Aulis Rytkönen, Finnish international footballer (born 1929)
 24 April: Sandy Jardine, Scottish international footballer and manager (born 1948)
 25 April: Francesc Vilanova, Spanish footballer and manager (born 1968)
 27 April: Vujadin Boškov, Yugoslav international football player and coach (born 1931)
 29 April: Tahar Chaïbi, Tunisian international footballer (born 1946)

May
 1 May: Georg Stollenwerk, German international footballer and trainer (born 1930)
 8 May: Henning Elting, Danish international footballer (born 1925)
 21 May: Duncan Cole, New Zealand international footballer (born 1958)
 23 May: Joel Camargo, Brazilian international footballer (born 1946)
 25 May: Washington César Santos, Brazilian international footballer (born 1960)
 31 May: Marinho Chagas, Brazilian international footballer (born 1952)

June
 2 June: Gennadi Gusarov, Soviet international footballer (born 1937)
 2 June: Phạm Huỳnh Tam Lang, Vietnamese international footballer and coach (born 1942)
 13 June: Gyula Grosics, Hungarian international football player and manager (born 1926)

July
 3 July: Volkmar Groß, German international footballer (born 1948)
 7 July: Alfredo Di Stéfano, Argentine-Spanish international footballer and coach (born 1926)
 14 July: Vasile Zavoda, Romanian international footballer (born 1929)
 19 July: Petar Nikezić, Yugoslavian-Serbian international footballer (born 1950)

August
 1 August: Valyantsin Byalkevich, Belaurusian football player (born 1973)
 3 August: Wimper Guerrero, Ecuadorian football midfielder (born 1982)
 3 August: Helmut Faeder, German footballer (born 1935)
 4 August: Rodolfo Motta, Argentine footballer and coach (born 1944)
 4 August: Rodrigo Osorio, Salvadoran footballer
 6 August: Jimmy Walsh, English footballer (born 1930)
 7 August: Alberto Pérez Zabala, Spanish footballer (born 1925)
 8 August: Viktor Kopyl, Ukrainian footballer (born 1960)
 9 August: Andriy Bal, Ukrainian football midfielder and coach (born 1958)
 9 August: Dae Llyoyd, American football player (born 1936)
 11 August: Vladimir Beara, Yugoslav football player (born 1928)
 11 August: Djalma Cavalcante, Brazilian football player (born 1957)
 11 August: Stelio Nardin, Italian footballer (born 1939)
 12 August: Kazimierz Trampisz, Polish footballer (born 1929)
 13 August: Kurt Tschenscher, German football referee (born 1928)
 13 August: Süleyman Seba, Turkish footballer (born 1926)
 14 August: Géza Gulyás, Hungarian footballer (born 1931)
 14 August: Javier Guzmán, Mexican football defender (born 1945)
 15 August: Bruno Petroni, Italian footballer (born 1941)
 15 August: Ferdinando Riva, Swiss footballer (born 1930)
 17 August: Sammy Conn, Scottish footballer (born 1961)
 18 August: Jean Nicolay, Belgian football goalkeeper (born 1937)
 19 August: Carlos Arango, Colombian footballer (born 1928)
 20 August: Eric Barber, Irish footballer (born 1942)
 20 August: José Luis Saldívar, Mexican footballer
 21 August: Don Clark, English footballer (born 1917)
 22 August: Pete Ladygo, American football player (born 1928)
 23 August: Albert Ebossé Bodjongo, Cameroonian international footballer (born 1989)
 27 August: Jean-François Beltramini, French footballer (born 1948)
 27 August: Bobby Kinloch, Scottish footballer (born 1935)
 28 August: Carlos Alberto Etcheverry, Argentine football player (born 1933)
 28 August: Fernando Zunzunegui, Spanish footballer (born 1943)

September
 4 September: Willie Finlay, Scottish footballer (born 1926)
 6 September: Arne Amundsen, Norwegian football goalkeeper (born 1952)
 7 September: Nikolay Adamets, Belarusian footballer (born 1982)
 9 September: David Whyte, English footballer (born 1971)
 10 September: Károly Sándor, Hungarian international footballer (born 1928)
 10 September: Joakim Vislavski, Serbian footballer (born 1940)
 12 September: Harold Williams, Welsh international footballer (born 1924)
 13 September: Milan Galić, Serbian footballer (born 1938)
 16 September: Dinis Vital, Portuguese footballer (born 1932)
 17 September: Andriy Husin, Ukrainian international footballer and coach (born 1972)
 22 September: Fernando Cabrita, Portuguese international footballer and manager (born 1923)
 22 September: Billy Neil, Scottish footballer (born 1939)
 23 September: John Divers, Scottish footballer (born 1940)
 25 September: Vladimir Dolbonosov, Russian footballer (born 1949)
 28 September: Tim Rawlings, English footballer (born 1932)
 29 September: Hugh Doherty, Irish footballer (born 1921)
 29 September: Len Stephenson, English footballer (born 1930)

October
 3 October: Jean-Jacques Marcel, French international footballer (born 1931)
 3 October: Lori Sandri, Brazilian football manager (born 1949)
 4 October: Fyodor Cherenkov, Soviet and Russian international footballer and manager (born 1959)
 6 October: Feridun Buğeker, Turkish international footballer (born 1933)
 6 October: Mikhail Potylchak, Russian footballer (born 1972)
 6 October: Serhiy Zakarlyuka, Ukrainian footballer (born 1976)
 7 October: Amos Mkhari, South African footballer
 7 October: Nika Kiladze, Georgian footballer (born 1988)
 9 October: Henning Bjerregaard, Danish footballer (born 1927)
 10 October: Roy Law, English footballer (born 1937)
 11 October: Carmelo Simeone, Argentine international footballer (born 1933)
 12 October: Roberto Telch, Argentine international footballer (born 1943)
 13 October: Pontus Segerström, Swedish footballer (born 1981)
 16 October: Shalom Schwarz, Israeli footballer (born 1951)
 17 October: Daisuke Oku, Japanese international footballer (born 1976)
 17 October: Gero Bisanz, German footballer (born 1935)
 17 October: Vladimír Hrivnák, Slovak footballer (born 1945)
 18 October: Danny Light, English footballer (born 1948)
 19 October: Arnold Mitchell, English footballer (born 1929)
 19 October: Don Ratcliffe, English footballer (born 1934)
 19 October: Jim Sharkey, English footballer (born 1934)
 21 October: Jim Barrett, Jr., English footballer (born 1930)
 22 October: Anatoly Chertkov, Russian footballer (born 1936)
 22 October: George Francis, English footballer (born 1934)
 23 October: André Piters, Belgian international footballer (born 1931)
 24 October: Martin Garratt, English footballer (born 1980)
 24 October: Malcolm Thompson, English footballer (born 1946)
 26 October: Senzo Meyiwa, South African footballer (born 1984)
 27 October: Leif Skiöld, Swedish international footballer and ice hockey player (born 1935)
 27 October: Reidar Sundby, Norwegian footballer (born 1926)
 29 October: Klas Ingesson, Swedish international footballer and manager (born 1968)
 29 October: Rainer Hasler, Liechtenstein footballer (born 1958)
 30 October: Joe Brown, English footballer (born 1929)
 31 October: Armando Cavazzuti, Italian footballer (born 1929)
 31 October: Pat Partridge, British football referee (born 1933)

November
 1 November: Gustau Biosca, Spanish international footballer and manager (born 1928)
 1 November: Edson Décimo Alves Araújo, Brazilian footballer (born 1986)
 1 November: Ivor Seemley, English footballer (born 1929)
 1 November: Abednigo Ngcobo, South African footballer (born 1950)
 2 November: Vladimir Suchilin, Soviet footballer (born 1950)
 3 November: Geoff Cox, English footballer (born 1934)
 4 November: Derek Hogg, English footballer (born 1930)
 4 November: Eddie Stuart, South African footballer (born 1931)
 5 November: Mario Pietruzzi, Italian footballer (born 1918)
 5 November: Roy Hartle, English footballer (born 1931)
 7 November: Juan Taverna, Argentine footballer (born 1948)
 8 November: Giovan Battista Pirovano, Italian footballer (born 1937)
 8 November: Sammy Wilson, Scottish footballer (born 1937)
 9 November: Sammy Reid, Scottish footballer (born 1939)
 11 November: Jim Storrie, Scottish footballer (born 1940)
 13 November: Gus Cremins, Irish Gaelic footballer (born 1921)
 14 November: Kjell Hvidsand, Norwegian footballer (born 1941)
 14 November: Zaki Osman, Egyptian footballer
 14 November: Peter Rajah, Malaysian footballer
 15 November: Valéry Mézague, Cameroonian international footballer (born 1983)
 17 November: Ilija Pantelić, Serbian Yugoslav international footballer (born 1942)
 18 November: Iain Hesford, English footballer (born 1960)
 19 November: Gholam Hossein Mazloumi, Iranian international footballer and manager (born 1950)
 22 November: Sar Sophea, Cambodian international footballer (born 1992)
 23 November: John Neal, English footballer (born 1932)
 24 November: Reg Foulkes, English footballer (born 1923)
 25 November: Aurelio Milani, Italian footballer (born 1934)
 26 November: Malcolm Finlayson, Scottish footballer (born 1930)
 26 November: Ángel Tulio Zof, Argentine footballer (born 1928)
 26 November: Fikret Kırcan, Turkish footballer (born 1919)
 27 November: August Gottschalk, German footballer (born 1921)
 28 November: Lucidio Sentimenti, Italian footballer (born 1920)
 29 November: Ahmad Wartam, Singapore international footballer (born 1935)

December
 1 December: Jimmy Duncan, Scottish footballer (born 1930)
 4 December: Sitamadji Allarassem, Chadian footballer (born 1988)
 6 December: Juan Antonio Merlos, Salvadoran football player (born 1941)
 7 December: Tommy Todd, Scottish footballer (born 1926)
 7 December: Jerzy Wilim, Polish footballer (born 1941)
 9 December: Blagoje Paunović, Serbian footballer (born 1947)
 11 December: Benigno De Grandi, Italia footballer (born 1924)
 12 December: John Baxter, Scottish footballer (born 1936)
 12 December: José María Lorant, Argentine footballer (born 1955)
 15 December: Nicolae Manea, Romanian footballer (born 1954)
 16 December: Reidar Dørum, Norwegian footballer (born 1925)
 18 December: Ante Žanetić, Croatian footballer (born 1936)
 19 December: Pat Holton, Scottish footballer (born 1935)
 20 December: Seriki Audu, Scottish footballer (born 1991)
 20 December: Sam Morris, English footballer (born 1930)
 21 December: Åke Johansson, Swedish international footballer (born 1928)
 22 December: Moses Otolorin, Nigerian footballer
 23 December: Luis Condomi, Argentine footballer (born 1948)
 24 December: Rubén Amorín, Uruguayan footballer (born 1927)
 25 December: Ihor Nadein, Ukrainian footballer (born 1948)
 27 December: Ron Henry, English international footballer (born 1934)
 27 December: Erich Retter; German international footballer (born 1925)
 28 December: Javier Fragoso, Mexican international footballer (born 1942)
 29 December: Odd Iversen, Norwegian international footballer (born 1945)
 29 December: Samuel Sentini, Honduran international footballer (born c. 1948)
 30 December: Igor Kiselyov, Russian footballer (born 1979)
 30 December: Walter Roque, Uruguayan footballer (born 1937)
 31 December: Jimmy Dunn, Scottish footballer (born 1923)
 31 December: Romanus Orjinta, Nigerian footballer (born 1981)
 31 December: Luis Oruezábal, Argentine footballer (born 1952)

References

 
Association football by year